The 2018–19 Scottish Cup was the 134th season of Scotland's most prestigious football knockout competition. The tournament was sponsored by bookmaker William Hill in what was the eighth season of a nine-year partnership, after contract negotiations saw the initial five-year contract extended for an additional four years in October 2015.

The cup was won for the third consecutive occasion, and a record 39th in total, by the defending champions, Celtic who had won the 2018 Scottish Cup Final on 19 May 2018.

Calendar
The calendar for the 2018–19 Scottish Cup, as announced by Scottish Football Association.

Preliminary rounds

Draw
The draw for the preliminary rounds took place on Monday, 16 July 2018 at Hampden Park and was made by Scottish National Team Head Coaches Alex McLeish and Shelley Kerr.

19 clubs were involved in the draw, of which five received a bye to the second preliminary round, while the other 14 entered the first preliminary round. The teams competing in these rounds were made up of teams from the East of Scotland Football League (8), South of Scotland Football League (4), North Caledonian Football League (1), Scottish Junior Football Association (4) and the Scottish Amateur Football Association (2). Shortlees and Tynecastle took part in the Scottish Cup for the first time after winning the 2017–18 Scottish Amateur Cup and the 2017–18 South & East Cup-Winners Shield respectively.

There were three parts to the draw. The first part determined which five clubs, from the 14 eligible, received a bye to the second preliminary round. The clubs which did not receive a bye into the second preliminary round entered the first preliminary round. Seven ties were then drawn in the first preliminary round to be played on Saturday, 11 August 2018. The final part of the draw saw six ties drawn in the second preliminary round to be played on Saturday, 1 September 2018.

Clubs with a valid Club Licence at the date of the draw were eligible for a bye to the second preliminary round. Teams in Bold advanced to the first round.

Preliminary round one
Girvan, Linlithgow Rose, Lothian Thistle Hutchison Vale, Newton Stewart, and Wigtown & Bladnoch received a bye to preliminary round two.

Matches

Preliminary round two

Matches

First round

The first round took place on the weekend of 22 September 2018. Along with the six winners from the second preliminary round, there were 30 new entries at this stage -  16 from the Highland Football League and 14 from the Lowland Football League.

Draw

The draw for the first round took place on Saturday, 1 September 2018 at Hampden Park and was made by former Scottish Cup winner Robbie Neilson and boxer Charlie Flynn. Selkirk withdrew from the competition before the draw was made so one team received a bye to the second round.

Teams in Bold advanced to the second round.

BSC Glasgow were drawn to receive a bye to the second round.

Matches

Replays

Second round
The second round took place on the weekend of 20 October 2018. Along with the 17 winners and one bye from the first round, there were 14 new entries at this stage - two each from the Highland Football League and the Lowland Football League and all 10 from League Two.

Draw
The draw for the second round took place at Hampden Park on 22 September 2018. The draw was made by Olympic bronze medallist Eve Muirhead and Kilmarnock's Scottish Cup winning captain Ray Montgomerie.

Teams in Italics were not known at the time of the draw. Teams in Bold advanced to the third round.

Matches

Replay

Third round
The third round took place on the weekend of 24 November 2018. Along with the 16 winners from the second round, there were 16 new entries at this stage - all 10 from League One, and six from the Championship.

Draw

The draw for the third round took place at Hampden Park on 20 October 2018 at 5:45pm.

Teams in Italics were not known at the time of the draw. Teams in Bold advanced to the fourth round.

Matches

Replays

Fourth round
The fourth round took place on the weekend of 19 January 2019. Along with the 16 winners from the third round, there were 16 new entries at this stage - the remaining four clubs from the Championship, and all 12 from the Premiership.

Draw

The draw for the fourth round took place at Hampden Park on 24 November 2018 at 5:45pm. 

Teams in Italics were not known at the time of the draw. Teams in Bold advanced to the fifth round.

Matches

Replays

Fifth round
The fifth round took place on the weekend of 9 February 2019.

Draw
The draw for the fifth round took place at Tynecastle Stadium on 20 January 2019 following the Hearts v Livingston match live on BBC One Scotland. 

Teams in Italics were not known at the time of the draw. Teams in Bold advanced to the quarter-finals.

Matches

Replays

Quarter-finals

The quarter-finals took place on the weekend of 2 March 2019.

Draw
The draw for the quarter-finals took place at Victoria Park on 11 February 2019 following the Ross County v Inverness Caledonian Thistle match live on BBC Two Scotland.

Teams in Italics were not known at the time of the draw. Teams in Bold advanced to the semi-finals.

Matches

Replays

Semi-finals

The semi-finals took place on the weekend of 13 April 2019.

Draw
The draw for the semi-finals took place at Firhill Stadium on 4 March 2019 during 'The Nine' live on BBC Scotland.

Teams in Italics were not known at the time of the draw. Teams in Bold advanced to the final.

Matches

Final

The final was played on 25 May 2019 at Hampden Park in Glasgow.

Bracket
The following is the bracket which the Scottish Cup resembled. Numbers in parentheses next to the match score represent the results of a replay, and numbers in parentheses next to the replay score represents the results of a penalty shoot-out.

Media coverage
From round four onwards, selected matches from the Scottish Cup are broadcast live in the UK and Ireland by BBC Scotland and Premier Sports (EIR Sport in the Republic of Ireland). BBC Scotland has the option to show two ties per round, with Premier Sports also showing two ties per round; Premier Sports show both semi-finals live with one of them also on BBC Scotland, and both channels screen the final live.

The following matches are to be broadcast live on UK television:

References

2018–19 in Scottish football cups

2018–19
2018–19 European domestic association football cups